Kyriakos Mavronikolas (born 25 January 1955) is a Cypriot Movement for Social Democracy politician. He served as the Cypriot Minister of Defence from 2003 to 2006, and he sat as a Member of the European Parliament for Cyprus from 2009 to 2012, when he vacated his seat and was replaced by Sophocles Sophocleous. Mavronikolas is a graduate of the University of Athens faculty of medicine, and outside politics he works as an ophthalmologist.

Footnotes

1955 births
Living people
People from Paphos
Cyprus Ministers of Defence
Movement for Social Democracy MEPs
MEPs for Cyprus 2009–2014
National and Kapodistrian University of Athens alumni